The Baltic Women's Basketball League (BWBL) is a top-level regional basketball league, featuring women's teams from Belarus, Estonia, Lithuania, Poland, Russia and Ukraine. Teams from Finland, Kazakhstan, Latvia and Sweden have competed in the past seasons.

Finals

External links
 Official website
 Profile at eurobasket.com

 
Multi-national women's basketball leagues in Europe
1994 establishments in Europe
Sports leagues established in 1994
Sport in the Baltic states
Basketball leagues in Lithuania
Basketball leagues in Estonia
Basketball leagues in Latvia
Multi-national professional sports leagues